The 2022 AFC Cup group stage was played from 18 May to 30 June 2022. A total of 39 teams competed in the group stage to decide the 12 places in the knockout stage of the 2022 AFC Cup.

Draw

The draw for the group stage was held on 17 January 2022 at AFC House in Kuala Lumpur, Malaysia. The 39 teams were drawn into nine groups of four and one group of three (in the Central Asia Zone): three groups each in the West Asia Zone (Groups A–C) and the ASEAN Zone (Groups G–I), two groups in the Central Asia Zone (Groups E–F), and one group each in the South Asia Zone (Group D) and the East Asia Zone (Group J). For each zone, teams were seeded into four pots and drawn into the relevant positions within each group, based on their association ranking and their seeding within their association, in consideration of technical balance between groups. Teams from the same association in zones with more than one group (West Asia Zone, Central Asia Zone, and ASEAN Zone) could not be drawn into the same group.

Standby teams
 Ayeyawady United (for Shan United)

Format

In the group stage, each group is played on a single round-robin basis in centralised venues. The following teams will advance to the knockout stage:
The winners of each group and the best runners-up in the West Asia Zone and the ASEAN Zone advance to the Zonal semi-finals.
The winners of each group in the Central Asia Zone advance to the Zonal finals.
The winners of each group in the South Asia Zone and the East Asia Zone advance to the Inter-zone play-off semi-finals.

Tiebreakers

The teams are ranked according to points (3 points for a win, 1 point for a draw, 0 points for a loss). If tied on points, tiebreakers were applied in the following order (Regulations Article 8.3):
Points in head-to-head matches among tied teams;
Goal difference in head-to-head matches among tied teams;
Goals scored in head-to-head matches among tied teams;
Away goals scored in head-to-head matches among tied teams (Not applicable since matches will be played in centralised venues);
If more than two teams are tied, and after applying all head-to-head criteria above, a subset of teams are still tied, all head-to-head criteria above are reapplied exclusively to this subset of teams;
Goal difference in all group matches;
Goals scored in all group matches;
Penalty shoot-out if only two teams playing each other in the last round of the group are tied;
Disciplinary points (yellow card = 1 point, red card as a result of two yellow cards = 3 points, direct red card = 3 points, yellow card followed by direct red card = 4 points);
Association ranking;
Drawing of lots.

Schedule
The schedule of each matchday was as follows.

Centralised venues
On 24 February 2022, AFC confirmed hosts for the group stage. on 25 April 2022, the Chinese Taipei Football Association withdrew from hosting the Group J matches. Later, on 5 May, Buriram were declared as the centralised venue to host the Group J matches.
Group A: Muscat, Oman (Al-Seeb Stadium)
Group B: Kuwait City, Kuwait (Al Kuwait Sports Club Stadium)
Group C: Muharraq, Bahrain (Muharraq Stadium)
Group D: Kolkata, India (Vivekananda Yuba Bharati Krirangan)
Group E: Dushanbe, Tajikistan (Pamir Stadium)
Group F: Bishkek, Kyrgyzstan (Dolen Omurzakov Stadium)
Group G: Gianyar, Indonesia (Kapten I Wayan Dipta Stadium)
Group H: Kuala Lumpur, Malaysia (Kuala Lumpur Stadium)
Group I: Ho Chi Minh City, Vietnam (Thống Nhất Stadium)
Group J: Buriram, Thailand (Buriram Stadium)

Groups

Group A

Group B

Group C

Group D

Group E

Group F

Group G

Group H

Group I

Group J

Ranking of runner-up teams

West Asia Zone

ASEAN Zone

Notes

References

External links

2
May 2022 sports events in Asia
June 2022 sports events in Asia